Kenny Nolan (born September 30, 1949) is an American singer-songwriter from Los Angeles.

He is best remembered for the 1976–77 song "I Like Dreamin'", which he wrote and performed; it reached No. 3 on the Billboard Hot 100 and No. 4 on the Easy Listening chart. He wrote Swing Your Daddy, which became a 1975 summer hit for Jim Gilstrap, reaching No.4 in the UK charts and No.10 on the American Billboard Black Music chart of that year.

Nolan also co-wrote several hits with Bob Crewe, including Frankie Valli's "My Eyes Adored You" and Labelle's "Lady Marmalade" (both 1974).

Life and career
At the age of 13 he won a scholarship to the University of Southern California for Musical composition, but dropped out after six months, bored with the conventional regimen. Four years later, a scholarship to Chouinard went the same way, and Nolan decided to send songs in to any musician he thought might be suitable. It brought him to the attention of both veteran songwriter Bob Crewe and entrepreneur Wes Farrell, both of whom harnessed the then youngster's talent.

As house producer at Farrell's Chelsea record label, Nolan wrote and/or produced a string of successful singles for the label, including Jim Gilstrap's "Swing Your Daddy" and "Take Your Daddy for a Ride"; Dee Clark's "Ride a Wild Horse"; and Linda Carr's "High Wire". With Crewe, meanwhile, he co-wrote some of the era's biggest successes. They included Disco-Tex and the Sex-O-Lettes' "Get Dancin'", Labelle's "Lady Marmalade", and Frankie Valli's "My Eyes Adored You". He wrote the song "Flirtin'" for the 1971 The Donny Osmond Album, as well as the final top 40 hit for Tavares in 1982, entitled "A Penny for Your Thoughts".

Nolan also had ambition to perform – he supplied the falsetto that dominated "Get Dancin'" – and, after a short tenure with Firefly, he moved onto the studio group The Eleventh Hour. Produced by Crewe, the band scored two minor hits in the United States with "So Good" (1974) and the album, Hollywood Hot (1976).

In 1976, Nolan decided to record his own version of a song he had been commissioned to write by another. "I Like Dreamin'" was released by the Eleventh Hour's label, 20th Century, and in early November it finally entered the U.S. chart, to begin a three-month crawl to its peak at No. 3.

Nolan followed it the spring after with the top 20 hit "Love's Grown Deep", taken from his self-titled album; he was named Number One New Pop Singles Artist of 1977 by Billboard magazine. "My Eyes Get Blurry" was the next single, from Nolan's second album, 1978's A Song Between Us. Night Miracles followed two years later, bringing a new single, "Us and Love (We Go Together)", to the mid-reaches of the chart in early 1980, but it failed to give Nolan any further major success.

He continued to record, however, signing to MCA and releasing Head to Toe in 1982. That album produced two singles, "Love Song" and "Soft Rock Hard Love", but further commercial success as a recording artist eluded him. However, he continued to write songs that became hits for other artists, including "Shoot 'Em Up Movies", which became a top ten R&B hit for soul/boogie band the Deele in 1988.

In the 1990s he wrote "Masterpiece" which became a crossover hit for another soul band, Atlantic Starr.

Discography

Singles

References

1949 births
Living people
American male singer-songwriters
20th Century Fox Records artists
Casablanca Records artists
USC Thornton School of Music alumni
Singers from Los Angeles
20th-century American singers
21st-century American singers
20th-century American male singers
21st-century American male singers
Singer-songwriters from California